Vaux-Lavalette is a commune in the Charente department in southwestern France.

Geography
The Lizonne forms the commune's eastern border.

Population

See also
Communes of the Charente department

References

Communes of Charente